Pailin municipality is a municipality (krong) in the centre of Pailin province in north-western Cambodia. The municipality is subdivided into 4 communes (sangkat) and 36 villages (phum). According to the 1998/2008 census of Cambodia, the 575 km2 city had a population of 15,800 and 36,354 respectively.

References

External links

 Official Pailin Tourism – The Official Cambodian Ministry of Tourism website for the city of Pailin featuring tourist attractions, hotels and resorts, restaurants, useful information for travellers and more.

Districts of Pailin province